Holman Ranch was originally part of the Rancho Los Laureles, a  Mexican land grant in present-day Monterey County, California. The ranch passed through many hands until 1928, when San Francisco businessman, Gordon Armsby, purchased  in Carmel Valley, California, that would become the Holman Ranch. Today, the Holman Ranch continues as a privately owned winery, with a tasting room to sample their award-winning wines, and offers a venue for weddings and special events.

History

Holman Ranch was originally part of the Rancho Los Laureles, a   Mexican land grant was made to Vicente Blas Martinez and José Manuel Boronda (1803-1878), along with Boronda's son, Juan de Mata Boronda by Manuel Jimena on September 19, 1839. In 1868, the Boronda's son, Juan de Mata Boronda, sold the Rancho Los Laureles to Elihu Avery, who sold it to Ezekiel Tripp in 1874. Nathan W. Spaulding, later Oakland 's fifteenth Mayor, purchased a half interest on April 27, 1874. Abner Doble bought a half interest in 1875; Frederick Getchell and David Ayers in 1881; and Frank Hinkley a half interest in 1881.

In 1882, the Pacific Improvement Company purchased Rancho Los Laureles. In the 1900s the Pacific Improvement Company liquidated their holdings and the Del Monte Properties headed by Samuel FB Morse, acquired the land. William Hatton was manager. In 1923, they divided the land into 11 parcels, at $60 an acre. Golf champion Marion Hollins bought   . In 1926, Frank and Jet Porter, of Salinas bought  of the southeast corner of Rancho Los Laureles, calling it Robles del Rio, California. The Porters later acquired a portion of the Marion Hollins ranch and sold the northeast corner of Rancho Los Laureles to Byington Ford for an airpark.

In August 1928, Hollins sold a  ranch to San Francisco broker Gordon Armsby. She commissioned architect Clarence A. Tantau, who helped design the Hotel Del Monte, to build a Spanish-style hacienda out of Carmel stone with terracotta roofing, and oak-beamed ceilings. It became a Hollywood retreat for Charlie Chaplin, Theda Bara, Marlon Brando, and Clark Gable. It was once called Casa Escondido (Hidden House).

Clarence E. Holman (1877-1962), eldest son of Rensselaer Luther Holman (1842-1909, the founder of  Holman's Department Store in Pacific Grove, California, bought the ranch in 1943. In the 1950s and early 1960s, Clarence created a working dude ranch called the Holman's Guest Ranch, with bungalows, riding stables, and a stone ranch house. A rodeo arena was built in 1948, which was used by the Tri-County Horsemen Association to put on horse shoes and rodeos. After Holman died in 1962, his wife Vivian L. Ogden-Holman (1903-1981) continued managing the ranch, hosting rodeos, horse shows, and an annual celebration of the ranch's birthday called, The Fiesta de los Amigos (Friends Party).

In 1989, Dorothy McEwen Kildall and her partner James Fitch, bought the Holman Ranch and transformed it into a winery and a site for weddings, corporate parties, photo shoots, charity events, and an equestrian center. She died in 2005 and is survived by her daughter, Kristin Kildall, and her son Scott Kildall.

In 2006, the Holman Ranch was purchased by Thomas and Jarman Lowder. They restored the hacienda, expanded the guest amenities, and planted  of vineyards for Pinot noir, Chardonnay, and Pinot gris. In 2009, the first award-winning Holman Ranch wine was produced. In 2012, an underground wine cave was built. In 2020, the Holman Ranch opened a tasting room and offers a venue for weddings and events.

The Holman Ranch has an additional tasting room at 18 West Carmel Valley Road, in Carmel Valley. It offers wine tastings, an indoor venue, and an outdoor patio, as well as the retail purchase of its wine.

See also
 Napa County wine
 Ranchos of California
 Homestead (buildings)
 Ranch-style house

References

External links

 Official website

Wineries in California
Wine brands
Carmel Valley, California
1928 establishments in California
Laureles, Los
Family-owned companies of the United States